Valmir Nafiu (born 23 April 1994) is a Macedonian professional footballer who plays as a forward for FC Košice, on loan from Shkëndija.

Club career

Childhood and early career
Nafiu was born in Tetovo. Growing up in Tetovo, Nafiu joined the Shkëndija youth team. Nafiu was labelled as a gifted and talented player due to him possessing great agility and technical skill, which allowed him to debut for the senior team at the age of sixteen.

Shkëndija
Nafiu debuted for the senior team of Shkëndija in the 2010–11 season of the Prva Liga and helped the club win its first ever league title. He also played in the away leg of the Champions league qualifier against FK Partizan.

At the end of his debuting season, Nafiu garnered interest from FC Basel and FC Barcelona. Nafiu at seventeen was invited to go on trial to Barcelona. Nafiu, as a member of the Macedonian U17 national team at the time played alongside David Babunski, who was already a member of the Barcelona youth system. Barcelona scouts were watching Babunski but noticed Nafiu, who impressed the scouts and invited him to come on trial at Barcelona. He went on trial at Barcelona and every indication was that it went well. Swiss champions Basel became very interested in Nafiu and have been tracking him for months. Nafiu was also invited to join the Basel training camp earlier this year and he played several friendly games.

He went on trial where he impressed the Swiss club and Basel and Shkëndija reached a deal for Nafiu to remain in Switzerland before officially completing the transfer once he turned eighteen.

Basel
Nafiu officially joined on 23 April 2012, on his eighteenth birthday. He mainly played for the youth teams at Basel and was not capped at senior level. At Basel, Nafiu trained under Thorsten Fink, who highly regarded Nafiu as a very talented player who can play every position in the attack.

Hamburger SV
When Fink left Basel and took the managerial position at Hamburger SV, Nafiu followed suit. In 2012, Nafiu made his debut for Hamburg's reserve team. He made his Bundesliga debut at 25 October 2014 against Hertha BSC replacing Pierre-Michel Lasogga after 74 minutes in a 3–0 away defeat. He added a further Bundesliga appearance against VfL Wolfsburg on 9 November 2014, before he mutually terminate his contract with Hamburger SV in January 2015.

APOEL
On 27 January 2015, Nafiu signed a four-and-a-half year contract with contract with Cypriot club APOEL FC. He made his official debut on 31 January 2015, coming on as a 75th-minute substitute in APOEL's 0–1 away victory against Nea Salamina for the Cypriot First Division. He scored his first official goal for APOEL on 21 March 2015, in his team's 2–2 home draw against Apollon Limassol for the play-offs of the Cypriot First Division. In his first season at APOEL, he appeared in twelve matches in all competitions and helped his team to win both the Cypriot championship and the cup.

On 18 December 2015, APOEL announced that Nafiu's contract with the club was terminated by mutual consent.

Career statistics

Honours
FK Shkëndija
Macedonian First League: 2010–11, 2018–19

APOEL
Cypriot First Division: 2014–15
Cypriot Cup: 2014–15

References

External links
 APOEL official profile
 
 
 

1994 births
Living people
Sportspeople from Tetovo
Albanian footballers from North Macedonia
Association football forwards
Macedonian footballers
North Macedonia youth international footballers
North Macedonia under-21 international footballers
Macedonian First Football League players
KF Shkëndija players
FK Renova players
Swiss Super League players
FC Basel players
Bundesliga players
Hamburger SV players
Hamburger SV II players
APOEL FC players
Cypriot First Division players
Kategoria Superiore players
KF Skënderbeu Korçë players
FC Košice (2018) players
Macedonian expatriate footballers
Macedonian expatriate sportspeople in Switzerland
Expatriate footballers in Switzerland
Macedonian expatriate sportspeople in Germany
Expatriate footballers in Germany
Macedonian expatriate sportspeople in Cyprus
Expatriate footballers in Cyprus
Macedonian expatriate sportspeople in Albania
Expatriate footballers in Albania
Macedonian expatriate sportspeople in Slovakia
Expatriate footballers in Slovakia